Thomas Treadwell Davis (August 22, 1810 – May 2, 1872) was an American lawyer and politician in the U.S. state of New York. He served as a United States representative from New York during the latter half of the American Civil War and the subsequent beginning of Reconstruction.

Early life and education
Davis was born in Middlebury, Vermont, and moved to New York in 1817 with his parents who eventually settled in Clinton. He attended Clinton Academy and graduated from Hamilton College in 1831. Davis then moved to Syracuse, studied law, and was admitted to the bar. He began the practice of law in Syracuse.

Political career
He held many political positions in New York and was elected as a Unionist candidate to the 38th Congress. Davis was re-elected as a Republican to the 39th Congress, serving from March 4, 1863, to March 3, 1867. He was not a candidate for renomination in 1866 and after leaving Congress he resumed the practice of law in Syracuse.

Davis died in Washington, D.C., on May 2, 1872. His remains were cremated and the ashes deposited in Oakwood Cemetery in Syracuse.

Family life
Davis had an interest in railroading and coal mining. His grandfather Thomas Tredwell represented New York in the United States House of Representatives from 1791 to 1795.

References

External links

Hamilton College (New York) alumni
New York (state) lawyers
People from Middlebury, Vermont
People from Clinton, Oneida County, New York
Lawyers from Syracuse, New York
People of New York (state) in the American Civil War
1810 births
1872 deaths
New York (state) Unionists
Unionist Party members of the United States House of Representatives
Republican Party members of the United States House of Representatives from New York (state)
19th-century American politicians
Burials at Oakwood Cemetery (Syracuse, New York)
Politicians from Syracuse, New York
19th-century American lawyers